Hyperolius bocagei is a species of frog in the family Hyperoliidae. It occurs in an area spanning from Angola and northwestern Zambia through southern Democratic Republic of the Congo to southwestern Tanzania. It lives in seasonally flooded, lowland grassy pans. It may suffer localized habitat loss and degradation, but is not considered threatened overall.

References

bocagei
Frogs of Africa
Amphibians of Angola
Amphibians of the Democratic Republic of the Congo
Amphibians of Tanzania
Amphibians of Zambia
Amphibians described in 1867
Taxa named by Franz Steindachner
Taxonomy articles created by Polbot